Sten Gunnar Douglas Johansson (born 31 January 1960) is a Swedish actor, best known as Jan Martinsson in the films about Kurt Wallander.

Filmography
1991 – Hassel – Botgörarna
1996 – Jerusalem
1997 – Ogifta par
1997 – Tic Tac
1998 – S:t Mikael (TV)
1998 – Beck – Vita nätter
2000 – Livet är en schlager
2001 – Kaspar i Nudådalen (TV)
2004 – The Return of the Dancing Master (TV)
2005-2013 –  Wallander (TV)
2007 – Arn – The Knight Templar
2008 – Oskyldigt dömd (TV)
2012 –  The Impossible

References

External links
 
Swedish Film Database

1960 births
Living people
People from Solna Municipality
Swedish male film actors
20th-century Swedish male actors
21st-century Swedish male actors
Swedish male television actors